Doljești is a commune in Neamț County, Western Moldavia, Romania. It is composed of four villages: Buhonca, Buruienești, Doljești and Rotunda.

Natives
 George Scripcaru

References

Communes in Neamț County
Localities in Western Moldavia